The order Suliformes (dubbed "Phalacrocoraciformes" by Christidis & Boles 2008) is an order recognised by the International Ornithologist's Union. In regard to the recent evidence that the traditional Pelecaniformes is polyphyletic, it has been suggested that the group be divided to reflect the true evolutionary relationships, a 2017 study indicated that they are most closely related to Otidiformes (bustards) and Ciconiiformes (storks).

Systematics and evolution
Of the families in Pelecaniformes, only Pelecanidae, Balaenicipitidae, and Scopidae remain. The tropicbird family Phaethontidae has since been moved to their own order Phaethontiformes. Genetic analysis seems to show that the Pelecaniformes is actually closely related to the Ardeidae and Threskiornithidae. As for the Suliformes, they are distantly related to the current Pelecaniformes. According to Hackett et al. (2008), loons, penguins, storks, and as well as Suliformes and Pelecaniformes, all seem to have evolved from a common ancestor. The proposed waterbird superorder has been suggested.

In their landmark 2008 work Systematics and Taxonomy of Australian Birds, Australian ornithologists Les Christidis and Walter E. Boles coined the name Phalacrocoraciformes for the group due to the much greater number of species of cormorants (Phalacrocoracidae) over boobies and gannets (Sulidae). However, this has not been taken up elsewhere.

In 1994, American ornithologist Walter J. Bock wrote that the name Suloidea had been used consistently as a term for a superfamily containing the two families, so therefore "Sulidae" and not "Phalacrocoracidae" should take priority in any arrangement containing the two genera.

In 2010, the AOU adopted the term Suliformes for the taxon. The IOC followed in 2011.

In 1994, Martyn Kennedy and colleagues constructed a behavioural data set, with the resulting tree showing a high level of congruence with existing phylogenies based on genetics or morphology. It showed the darters as sister group to the cormorants and shags, with the gannets and boobies, then pelicans, then frigatebirds and lastly tropicbirds as progressively earlier offshoots.

Cladogram based on Gibb, G.C. et al. (2013)

Species

Fregatidae
 Magnificent frigatebird or man o'war, Fregata magnificens
 Ascension frigatebird, Fregata aquila
 Christmas Island frigatebird, Fregata andrewsi
 Great frigatebird, Fregata minor
 Lesser frigatebird, Fregata ariel
Sulidae
 Blue-footed booby, Sula nebouxii
 Peruvian booby, Sula variegata
 Masked booby, Sula dactylatra
 Nazca booby, Sula granti
 Red-footed booby, Sula sula
 Brown booby, Sula leucogaster
 Abbott's booby, Papasula abbotti
 Northern gannet, Morus bassanus
 Cape gannet, Morus capensis
 Australasian gannet, Morus serrator

Phalacrocoracidae
 Pygmy cormorant, Microcarbo pygmaeus
Reed cormorant, Microcarbo africanus
Crowned cormorant, Microcarbo coronatus
Little cormorant, Microcarbo niger
Little pied cormorant, Microcarbo melanoleucos
Brandt's cormorant, Urile penicillatus
Red-faced cormorant, Urile urile
Pelagic cormorant, Urile pelagicus
† Spectacled cormorant, Urile perspicillatus (extinct)
 Bank cormorant, Phalacrocorax neglectus
 Socotra cormorant, Phalacrocorax nigrogularis
 Pitt shag, Phalacrocorax featherstoni
 Spotted shag, Phalacrocorax punctatus
 Black-faced cormorant, Phalacrocorax fuscescens
 Australian pied cormorant, Phalacrocorax varius
 Little black cormorant, Phalacrocorax sulcirostris
 Indian cormorant, Phalacrocorax fuscicollis
 Cape cormorant, Phalacrocorax capensis
 Japanese cormorant, Phalacrocorax capillatus
 White-breasted cormorant, Phalacrocorax lucidus
 Great cormorant, Phalacrocorax carbo
 European shag, Gulosus aristotelis
 Flightless cormorant, Nannopterum harrisi
 Neotropic cormorant, Nannopterum brasilianum
 Double-crested cormorant, Nannopterum auritum
 Rock shag, Leucocarbo magellanicus
 Guanay cormorant, Leucocarbo bougainvillii
 Bounty shag, Leucocarbo ranfurlyi
 New Zealand king shag, Leucocarbo carunculatus
 Chatham shag, Leucocarbo onslowi
 Otago shag, Leucocarbo chalconotus
 Foveaux shag, Leucocarbo stewarti
 Auckland shag, Leucocarbo colensoi
 Campbell shag, Leucocarbo campbelli
 Imperial shag, Leucocarbo atriceps
 South Georgia shag, Leucocarbo georgianus
 Crozet shag, Leucocarbo melanogenis
 Antarctic shag, Leucocarbo bransfieldensis
 Kerguelen shag, Leucocarbo verrucosus
 Heard Island shag, Leucocarbo nivalis
 Macquarie shag, Leucocarbo purpurascens
Anhingidae
 Anhinga or American darter, Anhinga anhinga
 Oriental darter or Indian darter, Anhinga melanogaster
 African darter, Anhinga rufa
 Australasian darter or Australian darter, Anhinga novaehollandiae

References 

 
Seabirds
Bird orders
Taxa named by Richard Bowdler Sharpe